Windesheim University of Applied Sciences is a Dutch vocational university institute for higher education and research.
With over 27,000 students and more than 3,000 members of staff at sites in Zwolle and Almere, Windesheim is one of the larger universities of applied sciences in the Netherlands. Both Elsevier and Keuzegids HBO rank Windesheim as the number 2 University of Applied Sciences in the Netherlands, for already many years in a row.

Windesheim pursues a personal approach where students work in small groups and where each talent counts. Lecturers are coaches as well and they challenge students to get the best out of themselves. For extra talented students Windesheim has a honours programme where students can do extracurricular programmes. They also have the Windesheim Honours College with an international concept offering a unique four-year bachelor's degree programme in Global Project and Change Management. Windesheim is also renowned for its innovative and entrepreneurial approach. Windesheim has many close ties with the business community and public institutes which makes students' acquired knowledge immediately applicable in real-world situations. All students do internships at and projects together with companies and institutes during their study programme. This way of working empowers the professional field around Windesheim and their graduates.

Windesheim has over 50 bachelor programmes in the following fields of expertise:
- Business, Media and Law
- Education 
- Engineering and ICT
- Health and Social Work
- Journalism and Communication
- Sport and Therapy

Windesheim offers two English taught bachelor's programmes for international students:
- International Business 
- Global Project and Change Management

History
Windesheim university as it currently exists was formed in 1986 as the result of the merger of several education providers. The merger took place over a number of years with more and more institutions joining. The academy for Journalism and the academy for Social Studies from Kampen became part of the new institute as well as the School of Physical Exercise from Arnhem. Most of the education providers who joined were located in Zwolle: Higher Education in Economics and Administration (HEAO), Higher Education in Engineering and Technology (HTS), College of Education, School of Nursing, Academy of Journalism and Higher Education in Information Technology. These separate institutions all became part of Windesheim which then joined forces on an administrative level with the VU University Amsterdam. In 2012 this set up was discontinued and both institutions now have their own board and organization behind them. In September 2006, it changed its degree system to the bachelor/master system.

Awards

References

External links 

http://www.windesheim.com/

Christian universities and colleges in the Netherlands
Vocational universities in the Netherlands
Buildings and structures in Almere
Buildings and structures in Zwolle
Education in Flevoland
Education in Overijssel